The 1st century was the century spanning AD 1 (I) through AD 100 (C) according to the Julian calendar. The 1st century is considered part of the Classical era, epoch, or historical period. The 1st century also saw the appearance of Christianity.

During this period, Europe, North Africa and the Near East fell under increasing domination by the Roman Empire, which continued expanding, most notably conquering Britain under the emperor Claudius (AD 43). The reforms introduced by Augustus during his long reign stabilized the empire after the turmoil of the previous century's civil wars. Later in the century the Julio-Claudian dynasty, which had been founded by Augustus, came to an end with the suicide of Nero in AD 68. There followed the famous Year of Four Emperors, a brief period of civil war and instability, which was finally brought to an end by Vespasian, ninth Roman emperor, and founder of the Flavian dynasty. The Roman Empire generally experienced a period of prosperity and dominance in this period and the first century is remembered as part of the Empire's golden age.

China continued to be dominated by the Han Dynasty, despite a fourteen-year interruption by the Xin dynasty under Wang Mang. Han rule was restored in AD 23; Wang Mang's rule represents the watershed between the Western/Former Han and the Eastern/Later Han. The capital was also moved from Chang'an to Luoyang.

Regional events and politics

 Western Europe: Celtic, Germanic, Saami and Finnic tribal chiefdom and the Roman Empire
 Eastern Europe: Roman Empire, Dacian, Sarmatian, Venedae and Balt tribal chiefdoms
 North Africa: Roman Empire, Garamantes, Mauri, Libyan and Gaetulian tribal chiefdoms
 West Africa: Gur, Kwa, Soninke and Mande tribal chiefdoms
 Central Africa: Bantu tribes, collapsing Nok culture, Nok civilization
 East Africa: Kingdom of Kush, Kingdom of Blemmyes, Kingdom of Aksum
 Southern Africa: Bantu tribes, Khoisan
 Western Asia: Roman and Parthian Empires, Sabaean and Arabian Kingdoms
 Central Asia: Kushan Empire, Sarmatian, Dahae and other Iranian tribal chiefdoms
 South Asia: Kushan Empire, Western Satraps, Satavahana Empire, Dravidian Kingdoms, Kingdom of Kalinga, Indo-Parthian Kingdom, Zhangzhung
 Southeast Asia: Mandala of city-states, Kingdom of Funan
 East Asia: Han Dynasty, Yamatai, Xiongnu and Xianbei tribal chiefdoms, Three Kingdoms of Korea (Goguryeo, Baekje and Silla)
 Central America: Mayan, Teotihuacan and Zapotec civilizations
 South America: Nazca, Moche civilizations, Tairona tribal chiefdoms

Events

0s

10s

20s

30s

40s

50s

60s

70s

80s

90s

100

Inventions, discoveries, introductions
 Codex, the first form of the modern book, appears in the Roman Empire.
 Various inventions by Hero of Alexandria, including the steam turbine (aeolipile), water organ, and various other water-powered machines.
 c. AD 23: The Chinese astronomer Liu Xin dies, he documented 1080 different stars, amongst other achievements.
 AD 31: the Han Dynasty Chinese engineer and statesman Du Shi (d. AD 38) from Nanyang invented the first-known hydraulic-powered bellows to heat the blast furnace in smelting cast iron. He used a complex mechanical device that was powered by the rushing current against a waterwheel, a practice that would continue in China.
 AD 78: the beginning of the Saka Era used by South Asian calendars.
 c. AD 80: Although Philo of Byzantium described the saqiya chain pump in the early 2nd century BC, the square-pallet chain pump was innovated in China during this century, mentioned first by the philosopher Wang Chong around AD 80. Wang Chong also accurately described the water cycle in meteorology, and argued against the mainstream 'radiating influence' theory for solar eclipses, the latter of which was accepted by many, including Zhang Heng.

References

 
1st millennium
01st century